Elazığ Gazi Caddesi (Turkish: Elazığ Gazi Caddesi Kentsel Tasarımı) is the first urban design project in Elazığ, Turkey.

Geography 
The  Elazığ Gazi Caddesi is at the historical center of Elazığ. It starts from in front of the Elazığ Öğretmenevi and continues  to the west.

History 
Since inception of the Elazığ, Gazi Caddesi was always a major gathering place for the people. As the growth of the city of Elazığ step by step site surrounded by the high density mix used buildings. At 2005 Municipality of Elazığ completed the application of Gazi Caddesi urban design project and opened to the public.

Design 
Elazığ Gazi Caddesi urban design project was developed in 2004 by Turkish landscape architect Serpil Öztekin Erdem.

References 

Parks in Elazığ
Urban public parks
1943 establishments in Turkey